The mayor of Garnich is the mayor of the Luxembourgian commune of Garnich.

List

Footnotes

Mayors
Garnich